Zimamoto Football Club is a Tanzanian / Zanzibarian football club.

The team competes in the Zanzibar Premier League.

They competed in the CAF Champions League for the first time in 2017.

Achievements 
Zanzibar Premier League: 1
2016

Performance in CAF competitions 
CAF Champions League: 1 appearance
2017 – Preliminary Round

References 

Football clubs in Tanzania
Zanzibari football clubs